Borja Navarro Landáburu (born 13 May 1988) is a Spanish footballer who plays as a central defender.

Club career
Born in Puçol, Valencia, Navarro graduated with Valencia CF's youth setup, but made his senior debuts with neighbouring UD Puçol in Tercera División. On 29 January 2009 he returned to the Che, being assigned to the B-team in Segunda División B. Despite being a regular starter, he suffered relegation during the 2009–10 season.

On 28 July 2011 Navarro joined another reserve team, Real Betis B, also in the third division; he also experienced another relegation with the Andalusians in 2013, and moved abroad in January 2014, joining Romanian Liga I side AFC Săgeata Năvodari.

References

External links

Beticopedia profile 

1988 births
Living people
People from Puçol
Sportspeople from the Province of Valencia
Spanish footballers
Footballers from the Valencian Community
Association football defenders
Segunda División B players
Tercera División players
Valencia CF Mestalla footballers
Real Betis players
SCR Peña Deportiva players
Liga I players
AFC Săgeata Năvodari players
Spanish expatriate footballers
Spanish expatriate sportspeople in Romania
Expatriate footballers in Romania